Primo Michele Levi (31 July 1919 – 11 April 1987) was an Italian chemist, partisan, writer, and Jewish Holocaust survivor. He was the author of several books, collections of short stories, essays, poems and one novel. His best-known works include If This Is a Man (1947, published as Survival in Auschwitz in the United States), his account of the year he spent as a prisoner in the Auschwitz concentration camp in Nazi-occupied Poland; and The Periodic Table (1975), linked to qualities of the elements, which the Royal Institution named the best science book ever written.

Levi died in 1987 from injuries sustained in a fall from a third-story apartment landing. His death was officially ruled a suicide, but some, after careful consideration, have suggested that the fall was accidental because he left no suicide note, there were no witnesses, and he was on medication that could have affected his blood pressure and caused him to fall accidentally.

Biography

Early life 

Levi was born in 1919 in Turin, Italy, at Corso Re Umberto 75, into a liberal Jewish family. His father, Cesare, worked for the manufacturing firm Ganz and spent much of his time working abroad in Hungary, where Ganz was based. Cesare was an avid reader and autodidact. She too was an avid reader, played the piano, and spoke fluent French. The marriage between Rina and Cesare had been arranged by Rina's father.

In 1921 Anna Maria, Levi's sister, was born; he remained close to her all her life. In 1925 he entered the  primary school in Turin. A thin and delicate child, he was shy and considered himself ugly; he excelled academically. His school record includes long periods of absence during which he was tutored at home, at first by Emilia Glauda and then by Marisa Zini, daughter of philosopher Zino Zini. The children spent summers with their mother in the Waldensian valleys southwest of Turin, where Rina rented a farmhouse. His father remained in the city, partly because of his dislike of the rural life, but also because of his infidelities.

In September 1930 Levi entered the  Royal Gymnasium a year ahead of normal entrance requirements. In class he was the youngest, the shortest and the cleverest, as well as being the only Jew. Only two boys there bullied him for being Jewish, but their animosity was traumatic. In August 1932, following two years attendance also at the Talmud Torah school in Turin to pick up the elements of doctrine and culture, he sang in the local synagogue for his Bar Mitzvah. In 1933, as was expected of all young Italian schoolboys, he joined the Avanguardisti movement for young Fascists. He avoided rifle drill by joining the ski division, and spent every Saturday during the season on the slopes above Turin. As a young boy Levi was plagued by illness, particularly chest infections, but he was keen to participate in physical activity. In his teens, Levi and a few friends would sneak into a disused sports stadium and conduct athletic competitions.

In July 1934 at the age of 14, he sat the exams for the Liceo Classico D'Azeglio, a Lyceum (sixth form or senior high school) specializing in the classics, and was admitted that year. The school was noted for its well-known anti-Fascist teachers, among them the philosopher Norberto Bobbio, and Cesare Pavese, who later became one of Italy's best-known novelists. Levi continued to be bullied during his time at the Lyceum, although six other Jews were in his class. Upon reading Concerning the Nature of Things by Australian scientist Sir William Bragg, Levi decided that he wanted to be a chemist.

In 1937, he was summoned before the War Ministry and accused of ignoring a draft notice from the Italian Royal Navy—one day before he was to write a final examination on Italy's participation in the Spanish Civil War, based on a quote from Thucydides: "We have the singular merit of being brave to the utmost degree." Distracted and terrified by the draft accusation, he failed the exam—the first poor grade of his life—and was devastated. His father was able to keep him out of the Navy by enrolling him in the Fascist militia (Milizia Volontaria per la Sicurezza Nazionale). He remained a member through his first year of university, until passage of the Italian Racial Laws of 1938 forced his expulsion. Levi later recounted this series of events in the short story "Fra Diavolo on the Po".

He retook and passed his final examinations, and in October enrolled at the University of Turin to study chemistry. As one of 80 candidates, he spent three months taking lectures, and in February, after passing his colloquio (oral examination), he was selected as one of 20 to move on to the full-time chemistry curriculum.

In the liberal period as well as in the first decade of the Fascist regime, Jews held many public positions, and were prominent in literature, science and politics. In 1929 Mussolini signed an agreement with the Catholic Church, the Lateran Treaty, which established Catholicism as the State religion, allowed the Church to influence many sectors of education and public life, and relegated other religions to the status of "tolerated cults". In 1936 Italy's conquest of Ethiopia and the expansion of what the regime regarded as the Italian "colonial empire" brought the question of "race" to the forefront. In the context set by these events, and the 1940 alliance with Hitler's Germany, the situation of the Jews of Italy changed radically.

In July 1938 a group of prominent Italian scientists and intellectuals published the "Manifesto of Race," a mixture of racial and ideological antisemitic theories from ancient and modern sources. This treatise formed the basis for the Italian Racial Laws of October 1938. After its enactment Italian Jews lost their basic civil rights, positions in public offices, and their assets. Their books were prohibited: Jewish writers could no longer publish in magazines owned by Aryans. Jewish students who had begun their course of study were permitted to continue, but new Jewish students were barred from entering university. Levi had matriculated a year earlier than scheduled enabling him to take a degree.

In 1939, Levi discovered his passion for mountain hiking. A friend, Sandro Delmastro, taught him how to hike, and they spent many weekends in the mountains above Turin. Physical exertion, the risk, and the battle with the elements while following Sandro's example enabled him to put out of his mind the nightmare situation precipitating all over Europe as, communing with the sky and earth, he managed to satisfy his desire for liberty realize fully his own strength, and the reasons behind his ardent need grasp the nature of things that had led him to study chemistry, as he later wrote in the chapter "Iron" of The Periodic Table (1975). In June 1940 Italy declared war as an ally of Germany against Britain and France, and the first Allied air raids on Turin began two days later. Levi's studies continued during the bombardments. The family suffered additional strain as his father became bedridden with bowel cancer.

Chemistry 
Because of the new racial laws and the increasing intensity of prevalent fascism, Levi had difficulty finding a supervisor for his graduation thesis, which was on the subject of Walden inversion, a study of the asymmetry of the carbon atom. Eventually taken on by Dr. Nicolò Dallaporta, he graduated in mid-1941 with full marks and merit, having submitted additional theses on x-rays and electrostatic energy. His degree certificate bore the remark, "of Jewish race". The racial laws prevented Levi from finding a suitable permanent job after graduation.

In December 1941 Levi received an informal job offer from an Italian officer to work as a chemist, under a clandestine identity, at an asbestos mine in San Vittore. The project was to extract nickel from the mine spoil, a challenge he accepted with pleasure. Levi later understood that, if successful, he would be aiding the German war effort, which was suffering nickel shortages in the production of armaments. The job required Levi to work under a false name with false papers. Three months later, in March 1942, his father died. Levi left the mine in June to work in Milan. Recruited through a fellow student at Turin University, working for the Swiss firm of A Wander Ltd on a project to extract an anti-diabetic from vegetable matter, he took the job in a Swiss company to escape the race laws. It soon became clear that the project had no chance of succeeding, but it was in no one's interest to say so.

In July 1943, King Victor Emmanuel III deposed Mussolini and appointed a new government under Marshal Pietro Badoglio, prepared to sign the Armistice of Cassibile with the Allies. When the armistice was made public on 8 September, the Germans occupied northern and central Italy, liberated Mussolini from imprisonment and appointed him as head of the Italian Social Republic, a puppet state in German-occupied northern Italy. Levi returned to Turin to find his mother and sister in refuge in their holiday home 'La Saccarello' in the hills outside the city. The three embarked to Saint-Vincent in the Aosta Valley, where they could be hidden.

The Italian resistance movement became increasingly active in the German-occupied zone. Levi and some comrades took to the foothills of the Alps, and in October formed a partisan group in the hope of being affiliated to the liberal Giustizia e Libertà. Untrained for such a venture, he and his companions were arrested by the Fascist militia on 13 December 1943. When told he would be shot as an Italian partisan, Levi confessed to being Jewish. He was sent to the internment camp at Fossoli near Modena. He recalled that as long as Fossoli was under the control of the Italian Social Republic, rather than Nazi Germany, he was not harmed.

Auschwitz 

Fossoli was then taken over by the Nazis, who started arranging the deportations of the Jews to eastern concentration and death camps. On the second of these transports, on 21 February 1944, Levi and other inmates were transported in twelve cramped cattle trucks to Monowitz, one of the three main camps in the Auschwitz concentration camp complex. Levi (record number 174517) spent eleven months there before the camp was liberated by the Red Army on 27 January 1945. Before their arrival, people were sorted according to whether they could work or not. An acquaintance said that it would make no difference, in the end, and declared he was unable to work and was killed immediately. Of the 650 Italian Jews in his transport, Levi was one of twenty who left the camps alive. The average life expectancy of a new entrant at the camp was three to four months.

Levi knew some German from reading German publications on chemistry; he worked to orient quickly to life in the camp without attracting the attention of the privileged inmates. He used bread to pay a more experienced Italian prisoner for German lessons and orientation in Auschwitz. He was given a smuggled soup ration each day by Lorenzo Perrone, an Italian civilian bricklayer working there as a forced labourer. Levi's professional qualifications were useful: in mid-November 1944, he secured a position as an assistant in IG Farben's Buna Werke laboratory that was intended to produce synthetic rubber. By avoiding hard labour in freezing outdoor temperatures he was able to survive; also, by stealing materials from the laboratory and trading them for extra food. Shortly before the camp was liberated by the Red Army, he fell ill with scarlet fever and was placed in the camp's sanatorium (camp hospital). On 18 January 1945, the SS hurriedly evacuated the camp as the Red Army approached, forcing all but the gravely ill on a long death march to a site further from the front, which resulted in the deaths of the vast majority of the remaining prisoners on the march. Levi's illness spared him this fate.

Although liberated on 27 January 1945, Levi did not reach Turin until 19 October 1945. After spending some time in a Soviet camp for former concentration camp inmates, he embarked on an arduous journey home in the company of former Italian prisoners of war who had been part of the Italian Army in Russia. His long railway journey home to Turin took him on a circuitous route from Poland, through Belarus, Ukraine, Romania, Hungary, Austria, and Germany - an arduous journey described especially in his 1963 work The Truce - noting the millions of displaced people on the roads and trains throughout Europe in that period.

Writing career

1946–1960 
Levi was almost unrecognisable on his return to Turin. Malnutrition edema had bloated his face. Sporting a scrawny beard and wearing an old Red Army uniform, he returned to Corso Re Umberto. The next few months gave him an opportunity to recover physically, re-establish contact with surviving friends and family, and start looking for work. Levi suffered from the psychological trauma of his experiences. Having been unable to find work in Turin, he started to look for work in Milan. On his train journeys, he began to tell people he met stories about his time at Auschwitz.

At a Jewish New Year party in 1946, he met Lucia Morpurgo, who offered to teach him to dance. Levi fell in love with Lucia. At about this time, he started writing poetry about his experiences in Auschwitz.

On 21 January 1946 he started work at DUCO, a Du Pont Company paint factory outside Turin. Because of the extremely limited train service, Levi stayed in the factory dormitory during the week. This gave him the opportunity to write undisturbed. He started to write the first draft of If This Is a Man. Every day he scribbled notes on train tickets and scraps of paper as memories came to him. At the end of February, he had ten pages detailing the last ten days between the German evacuation and the arrival of the Red Army. For the next ten months, the book took shape in his dormitory as he typed up his recollections each night.

On 22 December 1946, the manuscript was complete. Lucia, who now reciprocated Levi's love, helped him to edit it, to make the narrative flow more naturally. In January 1947, Levi was taking the finished manuscript around to publishers. It was rejected by Einaudi on the advice of Natalia Ginzburg, and in the United States was turned down by Little, Brown and Company on the advice of rabbi Joshua Liebman, an opinion which contributed to the neglect of his work in that country for four decades. The social wounds of the war years were still too fresh, and he had no literary experience to give him a reputation as an author.

Eventually Levi found a publisher, Franco Antonicelli, through a friend of his sister's. Antonicelli was an amateur publisher, but as an active anti-Fascist, he supported the idea of the book.

At the end of June 1947, Levi suddenly left DUCO and teamed up with an old friend Alberto Salmoni to run a chemical consultancy from the top floor of Salmoni's parents' house. Many of Levi's experiences of this time found their way into his later writing. They made most of their money from making and supplying stannous chloride for mirror makers, delivering the unstable chemical by bicycle across the city. The attempts to make lipsticks from reptile excreta and a coloured enamel to coat teeth were turned into short stories. Accidents in their laboratory filled the Salmoni house with unpleasant smells and corrosive gases.

In September 1947, Levi married Lucia and a month later, on 11 October, If This Is a Man was published with a print run of 2,000 copies. In April 1948, with Lucia pregnant with their first child, Levi decided that the life of an independent chemist was too precarious. He agreed to work for Accatti in the family paint business which traded under the name SIVA. In October 1948, his daughter Lisa was born.

During this period, his friend Lorenzo Perrone's physical and psychological health declined. Lorenzo had been a civilian forced worker in Auschwitz, who for six months had given part of his ration and a piece of bread to Levi without asking for anything in return. The gesture saved Levi's life. In his memoir, Levi contrasted Lorenzo with everyone else in the camp, prisoners and guards alike, as someone who managed to preserve his humanity. After the war, Lorenzo could not cope with the memories of what he had seen, and descended into alcoholism. Levi made several trips to rescue his old friend from the streets, but in 1952 Lorenzo died. In gratitude for his kindness in Auschwitz, Levi named both of his children, Lisa Lorenza and Renzo, after him.

In 1950, having demonstrated his chemical talents to Accatti, Levi was promoted to Technical Director at SIVA. As SIVA's principal chemist and trouble shooter, Levi travelled abroad. He made several trips to Germany and carefully engineered his contacts with senior German businessmen and scientists. Wearing short-sleeved shirts, he made sure they saw his prison camp number tattooed on his arm.

He became involved in organisations pledged to remembering and recording the horror of the camps. In 1954 he visited Buchenwald to mark the ninth anniversary of the camp's liberation from the Nazis. Levi dutifully attended many such anniversary events over the years and recounted his own experiences. In July 1957, his son Renzo was born.

In 1958 Einaudi, a major publisher, published it in a revised form and promoted it.

In 1958 Stuart Woolf, in close collaboration with Levi, translated If This Is a Man into English, and it was published in the UK in 1959 by Orion Press. Also in 1959 Heinz Riedt, also under close supervision by Levi, translated it into German. As one of Levi's primary reasons for writing the book was to get the German people to realise what had been done in their name, and to accept at least partial responsibility, this translation was perhaps the most significant to him.

1961–1974 
Levi began writing The Truce early in 1961; it was published in 1963, almost 16 years after his first book. That year it won the first annual Premio Campiello literary award. It is often published in one volume with If This Is a Man, as it covers his long return through eastern Europe from Auschwitz. Levi's reputation was growing. He worked to gain a reputation as a writer about subjects other than surviving Auschwitz.

In 1963, he suffered his first major bout of depression. At the time he had two young children, and a responsible job at a factory where accidents could and did have terrible consequences. He travelled and became a public figure. But the memory of what happened less than twenty years earlier still burned in his mind. Today the link between such trauma and depression is better understood. Doctors prescribed several different drugs over the years, but these had variable efficacy and side effects.

In 1964 Levi collaborated on a radio play based upon If This Is a Man with the state broadcaster RAI, and in 1966 with a theatre production.

He published two volumes of science fiction short stories under the pen name of Damiano Malabaila, which explored ethical and philosophical questions. These imagined the effects on society of inventions which many would consider beneficial, but which, he saw, would have serious implications.

In 1974 Levi arranged to go into semi-retirement from SIVA in order to have more time to write. He also wanted to escape the burden of responsibility for managing the paint plant.

1975–1987 
In 1975 a collection of Levi's poetry was published under the title  (The Bremen Beer Hall). It was published in English as Shema: Collected Poems.

Moments of Reprieve deals with characters he observed during imprisonment. The Periodic Table is a collection of short pieces, based in episodes from his life but including two short stories that he wrote while employed in 1941 at the asbestos mine in San Vittore. Each story was related in some way to one of the chemical elements. At London's Royal Institution on 19 October 2006, The Periodic Table was voted onto the shortlist for the best science book ever written.

In 1977 at the age of 58, Levi retired as a part-time consultant at the SIVA paint factory to devote himself full-time to writing. Like all his books, La chiave a stella (1978), published in the US in 1986 as The Monkey Wrench and in the UK in 1987 as The Wrench, is difficult to categorize. Some reviews describe it as a collection of stories about work and workers told by a narrator who resembles Levi. Others have called it a novel, created by the linked stories and characters. Set in a Fiat-run company town in Russia called Togliattigrad, it portrays the engineer as a hero on whom others depend. The underlying philosophy is that pride in one's work is necessary for fulfillment. The  engineer Faussone travels the world as an expert in erecting cranes and bridges. Left-wing critics said he did not describe the harsh working conditions on the assembly lines at Fiat. It brought Levi a wider audience in Italy. The Wrench won the Strega Prize in 1979. Most of the stories involve the solution of industrial problems by the use of troubleshooting skills; many stories come from the author's personal experience.

In 1984 Levi published his only novel, If Not Now, When?— or his second novel, if The Monkey Wrench is counted. It traces the fortunes of a group of Jewish partisans behind German lines during World War II as they seek to survive and continue their fight against the occupier. With the ultimate goal of reaching Palestine to take part in the development of a Jewish national home, the partisan band reaches Poland and then German territory. There the surviving members are officially received as displaced persons in territory held by the Western allies. Finally, they succeed in reaching Italy, on their way to Palestine.

The book was inspired by events during Levi's train journey home after release from the camp, narrated in The Truce. At one point in the journey, a band of Zionists hitched their wagon to the refugee train. Levi was impressed by their strength, resolve, organisation, and sense of purpose.

Levi became a major literary figure in Italy, and his books were translated into many other languages. The Truce became a standard text in Italian schools. In 1985, he flew to the United States for a 20-day speaking tour. Although he was accompanied by Lucia, the trip was very draining for him.

In the Soviet Union his early works were not accepted by censors as he had portrayed Soviet soldiers as slovenly and disorderly rather than heroic. In Israel, a country formed partly by Jewish survivors who lived through horrors similar to those Levi described, many of his works were not translated and published until after his death.

In March 1985 he wrote the introduction to the re-publication of the autobiography of Rudolf Höss, who was commandant of Auschwitz concentration camp from 1940 to 1943. In it he writes, "It's filled with evil . . . and reading it is agony."

The essays ranged from book reviews and ponderings about strange things in nature, to fictional short stories.

In 1986 his book  (The Drowned and the Saved), was published. In it he tried to analyse why people behaved the way they did at Auschwitz, and why some survived whilst others perished. In his typical style, he makes no judgments but presents the evidence and asks the questions. For example, one essay examines what he calls "The grey zone", those Jews who did the Germans' dirty work for them and kept the rest of the prisoners in line. He questioned, what made a concert violinist behave as a callous taskmaster?

These essays are very personal in nature. Approximately five or six chapters of this manuscript exist. Carole Angier, in her biography of Levi, describes how she tracked some of these essays down. She wrote that others were being kept from public view by Levi's close friends, to whom he gave them, and they may have been destroyed.

In March 2007 Harper's Magazine published an English translation of Levi's story , about a fictitious weapon that is fatal at close range but harmless more than a meter away. It originally appeared in his 1971 book , but was published in English for the first time by Harper's.

A Tranquil Star, a collection of seventeen stories translated into English by Ann Goldstein and Alessandra Bastagli was published in April 2007.

In 2015, Penguin published The Complete Works of Primo Levi, ed. Ann Goldstein. This is the first time that Levi's entire oeuvre has been translated into English.

Death 
Levi died on 11 April 1987 after a fall from the interior landing of his third-story apartment in Turin to the ground floor below. The coroner ruled his death a suicide. Three of his biographers (Angier, Thomson and Anissimov) agreed, but other writers (including at least one who knew him personally) questioned that determination.

In his later life, Levi indicated that he was suffering from depression; factors likely included responsibility for his elderly mother and mother-in-law, with whom he was living, and lingering traumatic memories of his experiences. According to the chief rabbi of Rome Elio Toaff, Levi telephoned him for the first time ten minutes before the incident. Levi said he found it impossible to look at his mother, who was ill with cancer, without recalling the faces of people stretched out on benches in Auschwitz.  The Nobel laureate and Holocaust survivor Elie Wiesel said, at the time, "Primo Levi died at Auschwitz forty years later."

Several of Levi's friends and associates have argued otherwise. The Oxford sociologist Diego Gambetta noted that Levi left no suicide note, nor any other indication that he was considering suicide. Documents and testimony suggested that he had plans for both the short- and longer-term at the time. In the days before his death, he had complained to his physician of dizziness due to an operation he had undergone some three weeks earlier.  After visiting the apartment complex, Gambetta suggested that Levi lost his balance and fell accidentally. The Nobel laureate Rita Levi-Montalcini, a close friend of Levi, agreed. "As a chemical engineer," she said, "he might have chosen a better way [of exiting the world] than jumping into a narrow stairwell with the risk of remaining paralyzed."

Views on Nazism, Soviet Union and antisemitism 
Levi wrote If This Is a Man to bear witness to the horrors of the Nazis' attempt to exterminate the Jewish people and others. In turn, he read many accounts by witnesses and survivors, and attended meetings of survivors, becoming a prominent symbolic figure for anti-fascists in Italy.

Levi visited over 130 schools to talk about his experiences in Auschwitz. He vigorously repudiated revisionist attitudes in German historiography that emerged in the Historikerstreit  led by the works of people like Andreas Hillgruber and Ernst Nolte, who drew parallels between Nazism and Stalinism. Levi rejected the idea that the labor camp system depicted in Aleksandr Solzhenitsyn's The Gulag Archipelago and that of the Nazi  (see Nazi concentration camps) were comparable. The death rate in Stalin's gulags was 30% at worst, he wrote, while in the extermination camps he estimated it to be 90–98%.

His view was that the Nazi death camps and the attempted annihilation of the Jews was a horror unique in history because the goal was the complete destruction of a race by one that saw itself as superior. He noted that it was highly organized and mechanized; it entailed the degradation of Jews to the point of using their ashes as materials for paths.

Distinct purpose of extermination camps

The purpose of the Nazi camps was not the same as that of Stalin's gulags, Levi wrote in an appendix to If This Is a Man, though it is a "lugubrious comparison between two models of hell." No one was excluded. No one could renounce Judaism; the Nazis treated Jews as a racial group rather than as a religious one. Levi, along with most of Turin's Jewish intellectuals, had not been religiously observant before World War II, but the Italian racial laws and the Nazi camps impressed on him his identity as a Jew. Of the many children deported to the camps, almost all were murdered.

Levi wrote in clear, dispassionate style about his experiences in Auschwitz, with an embrace of whatever humanity he found, showing no lasting hatred of the Germans, although he made it clear that he did not forgive any of the culprits.

Works

Adaptations 
 Five of Levi's poems (Shema, 25 Febbraio 1944, Il canto del corvo, Cantare and Congedo) have been set to music by Simon Sargon in the song cycle Shema: 5 Poems of Primo Levi in 1987. In 2021 the work was performed by Megan Marie Hart during the opening event of the festival year  commemorating the first documented mention of Jewish communities in the territory of present-day Germany.
 The 1997 film  (The Truce), starring John Turturro, was adapted from his 1963 memoir of the same title and recounts Levi's long journey home with other displaced people after his liberation from Auschwitz.
 If This Is a Man was adapted by Antony Sher into a one-man stage production Primo in 2004. A version of this production was broadcast on BBC Four in the UK on 20 September 2007.

In popular culture 
 Till My Tale is Told: Women's Memoirs of the Gulag (1999), uses a part of the quatrain by Coleridge quoted by Levi in The Drowned and the Saved as its title.
 Christopher Hitchens' book The Portable Atheist, a collection of extracts of atheist texts, is dedicated to the memory of Levi, "who had the moral fortitude to refuse false consolation even while enduring the 'selection' process in Auschwitz". The dedication quotes Levi in The Drowned and the Saved, asserting, "I too entered the Lager as a nonbeliever, and as a nonbeliever I was liberated and have lived to this day."
 The Primo Levi Center, a non-profit organisation dedicated to studying the history and culture of Italian Jewry, was named after the author and established in New York City in 2003.
 A quotation from Levi appears on the sleeve of the second album by the Welsh rock band Manic Street Preachers, titled Gold Against the Soul. The quote is from Levi's poem "Song of Those Who Died in Vain".
 David Blaine has Primo Levi's Auschwitz camp number, 174517, tattooed on his left forearm.
 In Lavie Tidhar's 2014 novel A Man Lies Dreaming, the protagonist Shomer (a Yiddish pulp writer) encounters Levi in Auschwitz, and is witness to a conversation between Levi and the author Ka-Tzetnik on the subject of writing the Holocaust.
In the pilot episode of Black Earth Rising, Rwandan genocide survivor and self-described "major depressive" Kate Ashby tells her therapist, in her final session addressing her survivors' guilt and having overmedicated herself with antidepressants, that she has read the Primo Levi book he'd assigned her, and if she chooses to attempt suicide, she'll jump straight out of a third story window.
The last track on The Noise by Peter Hammill is entitled "Primo on the Parapet".

References 
Notes

Bibliography
 
 
 
 
 

Further reading
 Giffuni, Cathe. "An English Bibliography of the Writings of Primo Levi," Bulletin of Bibliography, Vol. 50 No. 3 September 1993, pp. 213–221.

External links 

 Announcement of The Complete Works of Primo Levi
 
 International Primo Levi Studies Center
 Centro Primo Levi New York
 "Primo Levi's journeys of peace": an article in the TLS by Clive Sinclair, 11 July 2007
 Scriptorium – Primo Levi Includes writing by Levi
 Primo Levi page by the Operatist who composed in honor of Levi
 Primo Levi's Last Moments by Diego Gambetta, Boston Review, Summer 1999 issue.
 
 
 Primo Levi's house
 BBC Interview with Primo Levi
 Thames Television interview from 1972

1919 births
1987 deaths
1987 suicides
20th-century Italian Jews
20th-century Italian novelists
20th-century Italian poets
20th-century Italian politicians
20th-century male writers
20th-century memoirists
Action Party (Italy) politicians
Auschwitz concentration camp survivors
Fossoli camp survivors
Italian anti-fascists
Italian atheists
Italian chemists
Italian male novelists
Italian male poets
Italian male short story writers
Italian memoirists
Italian science fiction writers
Jewish atheists
Jewish anti-fascists
Jewish chemists
Jewish Italian writers
Jewish partisans
Levites
Members of Giustizia e Libertà
Modernist writers
Scientists from Turin
Premio Campiello winners
Strega Prize winners
Suicides by jumping in Italy
University of Turin alumni
Viareggio Prize winners